Let It Go is an album by jazz saxophonist Stanley Turrentine recorded for the Impuse! label in 1966 and performed by Turrentine with Shirley Scott, Ron Carter and Mack Simpkins. The CD release added four bonus tracks, three of which originally released on Scott's Everybody Loves a Lover recorded in 1964 and featuring Bob Cranshaw and Otis Finch in place of Carter and Simpkins.

Reception

The Allmusic review by Stephen Cook awarded the album 4 stars and states "For fans ready to graduate from Stanley Turrentine's many fine Blue Note sets, this excellent mid-'60s date on Impulse should be the perfect option".

Track listing
All compositions by Stanley Turrentine except as noted
 "Let It Go" - 5:55
 "On a Clear Day You Can See Forever" (Burton Lane, Alan Jay Lerner) - 6:58
 "Ciao, Ciao" - 5:54
 "T'ain't What You Do (It's the Way That You Do It)" (Sy Oliver, Trummy Young) - 5:31
 "Good Lookin' Out" - 5:23
 "Sure As You're Born" (Alan Bergman, Johnny Mandel) - 4:44
 "Deep Purple" (Peter DeRose, Mitchell Parish) - 4:49

Bonus tracks on CD reissue:
"Time After Time" (Sammy Cahn, Jule Styne) - 9:20
 "Sent for You Yesterday (And Here You Come Today)" (Count Basie, Eddie Durham, Jimmy Rushing) - 5:42
 "The Lamp Is Low" (DeRose, Parish, Maurice Ravel, Bert Shefter) - 8:07
 "The Feeling of Jazz" (Duke Ellington, George T. Simon, Bobby Troup) - 3:56

Personnel
Stanley Turrentine - tenor saxophone
Shirley Scott - organ
Ron Carter - bass (tracks 1-7)
Mack Simpkins - drums (tracks 1-7)
Bob Cranshaw - bass (tracks 8-11)
Otis Finch - drums (tracks 8-11)

Production
 Bob Thiele - producer
 Rudy Van Gelder - engineer

References

1967 albums
Stanley Turrentine albums
Impulse! Records albums
Albums produced by Bob Thiele
Albums recorded at Van Gelder Studio